Kazys Tallat-Kelpša (28 October 1893 – 22 February 1968) was a Lithuanian brigadier general, lecturer of the War School of Kaunas and Higher Officers' Courses, Chief of Cavalry of the Lithuanian Armed Forces.

Personal life

Kelpša had sister Ona Tallat–Kelpšaitė Jurskienė, who married with lieutenant colonel .

Kelpša married Janina Daugulytė, who gave birth to his only son Algis. His son graduated from the higher school in Cleveland and was Reserve Captain of the United States Army.

Early life

In 1914, Kelpša graduated from the Kaunas School of Commerce. Following the start of the World War I, he joined the Imperial Russian Army as a volunteer in 1914.

In 1918, in the wake of the February Revolution in Russia, its army was demobilized. Consequently, lieutenant Kelpša was released into the reserve.

Interwar Lithuania

In October 1918, Kelpša reached Vilnius. In Vilnius, in the Council of Lithuania, he registered in the lists of the officers, and was released home before being summoned. After resting for a couple of weeks and without receiving any summons, he went to Vilnius again and registered once again, this time in the newly established Ministry of National Defence of Lithuania. Following it, he has been ordered to go to his homeland and gather volunteers for the recovering Lithuanian Armed Forces. It was stated that in the next couple days the headquarters of the National Defense District would be established in Tauragė, to which he had to introduce himself.

As the time passed and the Soviet Russia invaded the depths of Lithuania, occupied Šiauliai – the connection with Vilnius was lost. The volunteers in groups went towards Vilnius. Finally, in the beginning of January 1919, the said military headquarters arrived to Tauragė and Kelpša introduced himself there.

As the core of the Lithuanian cavalry was organized in Kaunas, Kelpša was sent to Kaunas. After reaching Kaunas and presenting himself to the military leadership, he was assigned to the 2nd Cavalry Squadron attached to the Separate Battalion, which later became the 5th Infantry Regiment.

On 20 March 1919, Kelpša was transferred to the Headquarters of the Ministry of National Defence of Lithuania and was soon sent to France as a member of the Lithuanian Military Mission to the Paris Peace Conference.

On 27 January 1920, Kelpša was appointed a military representative in Latvia and Estonia. On 19 September 1920, he returned to Kaunas and was assigned to the 2nd Uhlan Regiment.

On 1 November 1923, Kelpša was sent to Belgium where in 1926 he graduated from the Royal Military Academy of Belgium. In 1927, he was appointed Chief of Staff of the First Military District.

In 1931, Kelpša was lecturer of the Higher Officers' Courses, in 1933 he was transferred to the War School of Kaunas.

Since 25 October 1934, Kelpša was Chief of Cavalry of the Lithuanian Armed Forces.

In 1936, Kelpša was awarded the military rank of brigadier general.

Occupations and World War II

Following the Soviet occupation of Lithuania in June 1940, Kelpša was fired from the Lithuanian Armed Forces on 25 June 1940.

Emigration

In 1944, Kelpša with his family departed to Germany, and since 1949 lived in Cleveland, United States. He worked in the sphere of railroads until 16 July 1961 when he retired.

In 1950, Kelpša established a branch of the Lithuanian Soldiers Veterans Union Ramovė in Cleveland and headed it.

References

1893 births
1968 deaths
Lithuanian generals
Lithuanian emigrants to Germany
World War II refugees
Lithuanian refugees
Lithuanian emigrants to the United States
People from Šilalė District Municipality